The Church of Jesus Christ of Latter-day Saints in Nigeria refers to the Church of Jesus Christ of Latter-day Saints (LDS Church) and its members in Nigeria.  At year-end 1983, there were 2,255 members in Nigeria.  In 2019, there were 192,144 members in 722 congregations making it the largest body of LDS Church members in Africa.

History

In the 1950s and 1960s, several thousand native Nigerians became interested in joining the LDS Church, despite the church having no formal presence in the country. In November 1962, LeMar Williams was set apart as a mission president in Nigeria. However, he was not able to get a visa as an American. N. Eldon Tanner, a Canadian, went to Nigeria and began negotiations with the Nigerian government.  While he was there, he dedicated Nigeria for the preaching of the gospel. Ambrose Chukwuo, a Nigerian college student studying in California, read Mormonism and the Negro and sent a letter to a Nigerian newspaper condemning the LDS Church's teachings on blacks. The newspaper published Chukwuo's letter and the letters of other students with similar opinions. The Nigerian government did not give the LDS Church a permit to proselyte and church president David O. McKay postponed proselyting plans.  In 1965, Williams obtained a visa to go to Nigeria and began preparing to set up a mission in Nigeria.  Since black Nigerians couldn't hold the priesthood, Williams was going to baptize those who were ready and set up auxiliary organizations that could function without the priesthood.  Black Nigerians would be allowed to pass, but not bless the sacrament. However, several members of the Quorum of the Twelve Apostles expressed concern about teaching black people and called for the program to be terminated. After a unanimous vote, they decided to end the program. They contacted Williams and told him to leave Nigeria immediately. The Biafran war in 1967 further postponed church work there.

With the 1978 Revelation on Priesthood, plans were again began to start the church in Nigeria. Ted Cannon and his wife, Janath, along with Rendell N. Mabey and his wife, Rachel, were sent to Nigeria, arriving in November 1978, five months after the revelation. They based their operations out of Enugu, and the first branch they organized was with Anthony Obinna as president. Most of the earliest converts they baptized were in various villages throughout south-eastern Nigeria and had been meeting and seeking church membership for years, if not decades.

At first Nigeria was administered by the church's International Mission. In 1983 a Nigerian, mission was organized, which originally also covered Ghana.

In 1988, the church's first stake in Nigeria was organized in Aba, with David W. Eka as president. In 1993, the second stake in Nigeria was organized in Benin City.

In 1998, Gordon B. Hinckley became the first church president to visit Nigeria, presiding at a large meeting in Port Harcourt. In 2000, Hinckley announced plans to build a temple in Aba. The temple was dedicated by Hinckley in 2005. In 2009, the temple was closed as foreign temple worker missionaries were withdrawn due to violence in the area. The temple was reopened in 2010 with a Nigerian as temple president and all temple workers being Nigerian.

By 2018, there were over 50 stakes in Nigeria. In that year church president Russell M. Nelson announced plans to build a temple in Lagos, Nigeria. The first stake in Lagos had been organized in 1995, and in 2015 it had gone from 3 to 5 stakes. The LDS Church was still most heavily concentrated in south-east Nigeria, with Akwa Ibom State alone having 12 stakes.

Much of northern Nigeria had no LDS Church presence and many areas in mid-Nigeria had only begun to have significant organizational presence of the church in the mid-2010s.

By mid-2019 there were 58 stakes in Nigeria, with the 58th stake being the 3rd based in the capital city of Abuja. The Abuja stakes were far and away the most northern in Nigeria, with the district in Jos containing the only other units of the church even close to that far north. The growth had in some places been very fast, with Yorubaland (not including heavily Yoruba Lagos State) having gone from no stakes in 2013 to 5 by 2019.

Other states that saw significant growth were Delta State, that went from a few branches in a district outside the state in 2015 to three districts and a stake in 2019. Benue State in the more central area of the country had one branch in 2015, and did not get a district until 2017. By 2019 the state had 3 districts.

Missions

The LDS Church announced creation of new Owerri mission in Nigeria in 2016. In November 2022, the LDS Church announced it would be creating the Nigeria Aba and Nigeria Abuja missions in July 2023.

Temples

Nigeria currently has 1 operating temple and 3 temples that have been announced.

See also

 Religion in Nigeria
 Christianity in Nigeria

References

External links
Official site of the Church

The Church of Jesus Christ of Latter-day Saints in Nigeria
1978 establishments in Nigeria